Vanuatu is an overwhelmingly Christian majority country, with adherents of Islam being a minuscule minority. Due to the secular nature of Vanuatu's constitution, Muslims are free to proselytize and build places of worship in the country. There are roughly 1,000 Muslims in the country according to online estimates

History
One of the earliest known Muslims in Vanuatu was Hussein Nabanga, who converted in 1978. Hussein Nabanga was a member of the Mele people and other Mele people (who originated from the tiny island of Imere Tenuku) were the earliest to follow. Now there are Muslims throughout many other islands in Vanuatu. Currently there is a registered Islamic society looking after religious matters; Muhammad Sadiq Sambo from Mele Village is the current president of the society. The first mosque in Vanuatu was established in 1992, in Mele Village in the outskirts of Port Vila. There is also another mosque on the island of Tanna in the Middle Bush area. There is a prayer place on the island of Erromango near Dillons Bay. Most Vanuatuan Muslims are Sunnis.

In 2007, it was reported that there were about 200 converts in the country, and mosques are springing up in the outer islands of the archipelago. Chiefs are often the target of proselytising Muslims, on the often correct assumption that if they convert then their extended families, clans and other islanders are likely to follow suit.

References

External links
 International Religious Freedom Report 2004 
 Marc Tabani, « L’islam des musulmans de Tanna (Vanuatu) », L’Homme, 233 | 2020. URL : http://journals.openedition.org/lhomme/36746 ; DOI : https://doi.org/10.4000/lhomme.36746 

 
Vanuatu